Egbema  is a town in Ohaji/Egbema, Local Government Areas of Imo State, Nigeria.

Infrastructure 
Egbema being a town in the Niger Delta region of Southern Nigeria, richly blessed with Natural Resources, and Abundance of Oil and Gas has attracted several projects including; Egbema Power Plant, -The Assa North-Ohaji South project (ANOH).

Population 
As of 2019, Egbema has an estimated population of over 375,837 people in the densely populated village.

References 

Towns in Imo State